Shrewsbury High School may refer to the following schools:

 Shrewsbury High School (Massachusetts), United States
 Shrewsbury High School, Shropshire, England